Markus Hallgrimson (born May 31, 1975 in Germany) is a German professional basketball player, most notable for his NCAA record for 16-three-point field goals in a single game. He is currently playing for RheinStars Köln in Germany.

The  shooting guard attended Montana St. Billings, where he achieved his record feat during the 1999–2000 season. Aside from the 16-field goal record, Hallgrimson also made his mark as the top 3-point shooter in NCAA-2, with a 40% percent record and an average 23.7 point haul per match.

In 2000, after graduating from college, Hallgrimson returned to his homeland and signed a professional contract with leading Bundesliga club Avitos Giessen, where he averaged just 5.3 points-per-game. The following season, Markus stepped down a division to join BCJ Hamburg Tigers with his 15.6 PPG, 2.1 RPG and 1.4 APG in 27 appearances leading them to the Bundesliga 2 Division title.

Despite his team winning promotion, Hallgrimson opted to stay in Bundesliga 2 with NVV Lions Mönchengladbach, yet after only 7 games, and an impressive 24.9 PPG, he was transferred to Chemitz 99.

Nicknamed "Montana", Hallgrimson now plays in Würzburg (3rd German division) for the second time alongside Croatian forward Hrvoje Pervan (Mercer College), former Seton Hall center Grant Billmeier and former Rhode Island center Michael Moten. He currently is Würzburg Baskets' second-best scorer with 20.1 ppg after 10 games and had several outstanding offensive performances such as a 40-point (12 three-pointers) game against COCOON Baskets Weiden.

Career history
2000–2001  Avitos Giessen
2001–2002  BCJ Hamburg Tigers
2002  NVV Lions Mönchengladbach
2002–2003  Chemnitz 99
2003–2004  TSK Würzburg
2004  Los Bairros
2004–2006  Geneve Devils
2006  ASC Theresianum Mainz
2006–2007  Mitteldeutscher BC
2007  Worcester Wolves
2007–2008  Würzburg Baskets
2009  SC Rasta Vechta
2013–present RheinStars Köln

References
Agents page
RheinStars announcement

1975 births
Living people
British Basketball League players
German expatriate basketball people in Spain
German expatriate basketball people in the United States
German men's basketball players
Giessen 46ers players
Lions de Genève players
Mitteldeutscher BC players
Montana State Billings Yellowjackets men's basketball players
NINERS Chemnitz players
SC Rasta Vechta players
Worcester Wolves players
Shooting guards
German expatriate sportspeople in England
German expatriate basketball people in the United Kingdom